Paul Pagk is a painter born in Crawley, England in 1962. He has lived and worked in New York since 1988.

Biography 

Pagk was born in 1962 of a Czech father and an English mother, who was also a painter and with whom he visited museums as a child.

He studied at the École nationale supérieure des Beaux-Arts in Paris (France) from 1978 until 1982, year in which he founded the « 55 rue des Panoyaux » space in Ménilmontant (Paris) - a working space for artists located in an old foundry. One year later he met the French gallerist Jean Fournier who became one of his first collectors.

In 1984, he exhibited at the galerie Jean Fournier in Paris and at the Musée des Arts Décoratifs. In 1987, he had his first solo-show at the galerie Jean Fournier, and exhibited also at the art center Crédac in Ivry (France) and at the Parc Floral of Paris. That same year, he was awarded the Prix Fénéon (Sorbonne University, Paris). In September 1988, he moved to New York where he had found an artist loft to rent, and what was supposed to be a one-year stay became a long-term one in New York. That year, he discovered the triple exhibition of Blinky Palermo, Imi Knoebel, and Joseph Beuys at the Dia Art Foundation in Chelsea (New York), which had an important impact on his work.

In 1990, he was included in the exhibition “Three Painters” curated by Tim Nye in Soho (New York), which included also American artist Jacqueline Humphries and Corean artist Huyn Soo Choi. In 1991, Tim Nye opened a non-profit space “Thread Waxing Space” in Soho with Paul Pagk’s first solo show in New York. In 1993, the second solo show of Paul Pagk at Thread Waxing Space was accompanied by a catalogue with a discussion between Tim Nye and Paul Pagk. The show received a lot of attention from public and media.

Since then, his work is regularly exhibited in France, United States and Europe.

He received several awards: Prix Fénéon (1987), Pollock-Krasner Foundation Grant (1998), Sheldon Bergh Prize (2000), Adolph and Esther Gottlieb Foundation Grant (2012), Pollock-Krasner Foundation Grant (2012), and Joan Mitchell Foundation Painters & Sculptors Grant (2014).

Work 
In a catalogue essay entitled, "The pleasure principle" published in 1999 for Paul Pagk's show at art center Le10neuf du CRAC in Montbeliard (France), American art curator Franklin Sirmans said "His heavily build up surfaces (Pagk often works on a single painting for three months) reemphasize the quality of the paint itself, and serve to expand the parameters of the visual space... It is also the visual density of the paint that is reminiscent of spirituality in a way that references the baroque quality of early Dutch painting...What strikes me after continually encountering his paintings over the last couple of years is the earnestness of the artist's endeavor which actually takes you on an art historical ride from Russian Constructivists like Malevich, to the deductive abstractions of Reinhardt and Newman in the 50s, to the conceptually-influenced monochromes of Ryman. While these canonical references allow the viewer to connect the dots in a fashion suggestive of thematic painting, that is not necessarily the case. The artist's style is thoroughly unique avoiding any burdensome odes to modernist or postmodernist longing."

When reviewing Paul Pagk's show in 1993 (Artforum International), art critic Donald Kuspit said, "Paul Pagk's abstract paintings show that the renewal of painting depends upon the renewal of what is fundamental to it: primitive sensory experience articulated through texture and elementary structure. The former is innate to surface, the latter marks it as the universal ground of presentation."

(Selection) 
2016 - Paul Pagk, Galerie Eric Dupont, Paris, France
2015 - ON PAPER Mamie Holst and Paul Pagk, presented by Jane Kim, 33 Orchard, New York City, USA
2014 - Œuvres récentes, Galerie Eric Dupont, Paris, France
2014 - Material Way,  curated by Kathleen Kucka, Shirley Fitterman Art Gallery BMCC, New York City, USA
2014 - (S)ITATIONS La beauté devient avant-garde une passion privée,  Musée de Sarrebourg, Sarrebourg, France
2014 - Summer Show, Focus on Painting,  FL Gallery, Milan, Italie
2014 - Brooklyn Bridge,  curated by Justine Frischmann, George Lawson Gallery, San Francisco, CA, USA 
 2013 - 18 Drawings and 1 Painting,  Studio 10, Brooklyn, New York, USA
 2013 - Come Together: Surviving Sandy, Year 1, curated by Phong Bui, Dedalus foundation, Brooklyn, USA
 2013 - La main invente le dessin, Centre culturel de rencontre, Abbaye de Saint-Riquier, France
 2013 - Four Tet,  JiM Comtempori, Barcelone, Espagne
 2013 - Emergence,  A Proposition by: Katrin Bremermann, Erin Lawlor & Yifat Gat, Hôtel de Sauroy, Paris, France
 2013 - Wit,  curated by Joanne Freeman, Painting Center, New York, USA
 2012 - Around the corner, Four Painters Living in Tribeca: Hermine Ford, Joanne Greenbaum, Paul Pagk, Gary Stephan,  organized by Lucien Terras, New York, USA
 2012 - Line and Plane,  McKenzie Fine Art, New York City, USA
 2012 - Surface Affect,  Miguel Abreu Gallery, New York City, USA
 2011 - Mesquite  drawings,   Some Walls, Oakland, CA, USA
 2011 - A Review,  Edward Thorp Gallery, New York, USA
 2011 - 70 Years of Abstract Painting – Excerpts, Jason McCoy inc. New York, USA
 2011 - Paper A-Z,  Sue Scott Gallery, New York, USA
 2011 - Geometric Days, curated by Papo Colo, Jeanette Ingberman, and Herb Tam, Exit Art, New York, USA
 2010 - Recent Paintings, My Red maybe your Orange, even, Galerie Eric Dupont, Paris, France 
 2010 - Painting and Sculpture, Foundation for Contemporary Art Benefit, Lehmann Maupin, New York, USA
 2010 - Informal Relations curated by Scott Grow, Indianapolis Museum of Contemporary Art, Indianapolis, USA
 2010 - Geometric Progressions, Edward Thorp Gallery, New York, USA
 2010 - Lush Life, curated by Franklin Evans and Omar Lopez-Chahoud, Scaramouche, New York, USA
 2009 - A fleur de peau II – Le dessin à l’épreuve, Galerie Eric Dupont, Paris, France 
 2008 - Present, curated by Jay Murphy, HP Garcia Gallery, New York, France
 2008 - Group Show, Galerie Eric Dupont, Paris, France
 2008 - Home is where the heart is,  Baukunst Galerie, Cologne, Allemagne
 2008 - Untitled (On Paper),  Moti Hasson Gallery, New York, USA 
 2007 - Inside the Pale, curated by Frank Schroder, Thrust Projects, New York, USA
 2007 - Orthodoxe/Hétérodoxe : choisir sa ligne, Le 10neuf, C.R.A.C. Monbéliard, France
 2007 - To K from P with love, Markus Winter, Berlin, Allemagne
 2007 - Aftermath & lexicon, Moti Hasson Gallery, New York, USA
 2007 - Beyond the Pale, curated by Candice Madey and Tairone Bastien, Moti Hasson Gallery, New York, USA
 2007 - Recent Paintings, Galerie Eric Dupont, Paris, France
 2006 - Trait, ligne, écrire l’espace,  F.R.A.C Beauvais, France
 2006 - Twist it Twice, curated by Franklin Evans, Moti Hasson Gallery, New York, USA
 2006 - Hands up/Hand down, Miguel Abreu Gallery, New York, USA

References 

14- 

1962 births
Living people
People from Crawley
English painters
Prix Fénéon winners